The 2019 İstanbul Cup (also known as the TEB BNP Paribas İstanbul Cup for sponsorship reasons) was a tennis tournament played on outdoor clay courts. It was the 12th edition of the İstanbul Cup, and part of the WTA International tournaments of the 2019 WTA Tour. It took place in Istanbul, Turkey, from 22 through 28 April 2019.

Points and prize money

Prize money

Singles main-draw entrants

Seeds

 Rankings are as of April 15, 2019.

Other entrants
The following players received wildcards into the singles main draw:
  Çağla Büyükakçay
  Svetlana Kuznetsova
  Pemra Özgen

The following players received entry from the qualifying draw:
  Irina Bara 
  Ana Bogdan
  Ivana Jorović
  Kateryna Kozlova
  Veronika Kudermetova
  Elena Rybakina

The following players received entry as lucky losers:
  Tímea Babos
  Julia Glushko

Withdrawals
Before the tournament
 Irina-Camelia Begu → replaced by  Tímea Babos
 Camila Giorgi → replaced by  Julia Glushko
 Ons Jabeur → replaced by  Margarita Gasparyan
 Tatjana Maria → replaced by  Lara Arruabarrena
 Anna Karolína Schmiedlová → replaced by  Johanna Larsson

Retirements
 Kirsten Flipkens (lower right pelvis injury)
 Margarita Gasparyan (dizziness)
 Anastasia Potapova (gastrointestinal)

Doubles main-draw entrants

Seeds 

 1 Rankings as of April 15, 2019.

Other entrants 
The following pairs received wildcards into the doubles main draw:
  Çağla Büyükakçay  /  Pemra Özgen 
  Melis Sezer /  İpek Soylu

Withdrawals 
During the tournament
  Barbora Strýcová (back injury)

Champions

Singles

  Petra Martić def.  Markéta Vondroušová, 1–6, 6–4, 6–1

Doubles

 Tímea Babos /  Kristina Mladenovic def.  Alexa Guarachi /  Sabrina Santamaria, 6–1, 6–0

References

External links
 Official website

2019 in Istanbul
2019 in Turkish tennis
Istanbul Cup
İstanbul Cup
İstanbul Cup